Religious America was a 1974 American television documentary series produced for the Public Broadcasting Service (PBS) television station WGBH-TV in Boston and covered various religious communities in the United States. The series producer was produced Philip Garvin and directed by Boyd Estus and Philip Garvin. The show included 13 weekly episodes.

List of Religious America episodes

References 

1970s American documentary television series
PBS original programming
1974 American television series debuts
1974 American television series endings